LinuxDoc is an SGML DTD which is similar to DocBook. It was created by Matt Welsh and version 1.1 was announced  in 1994. It is primarily used by the Linux Documentation Project. The DocBook SGML tags are often longer than the equivalent LinuxDoc tags.

LinuxDoc has a more succinct DTD than DocBook. Users of small to medium-size projects have found that it suits their purposes better than DocBook.

The Debian distribution of Linux has a linuxdoc-tools package.

See also
 Comparison of document-markup languages
 List of document markup languages

External links
 http://www.ibiblio.org/pub/Linux/docs/HOWTO/other-formats/html_single/Howtos-with-LinuxDoc.html
 A JavaScript based web page that generates LinuxDoc
 Sample of LinuxDoc generated with above generator
 The above LinuxDoc compiled to HTML using SGMLTools

References

Markup languages